Phyllopezus selmae is a species of gecko, a lizard in the family Phyllodactylidae. The species is endemic to Brazil.

References

Phyllopezus
Reptiles of Brazil
Reptiles described in 2022